Afotella is a monotypic moth genus of the family Noctuidae erected by William Barnes and Foster Hendrickson Benjamin in 1926. Its only species, Afotella cylindrica, was first described by Augustus Radcliffe Grote in 1880. It is found in western North America from Saskatchewan and Alberta south to California.

The wingspan is about 25 mm.

References

External links

 With images.

Hadeninae
Moths of North America
Noctuoidea genera
Monotypic moth genera